Sir Malcolm McIntosh KBE (3 March 1888 – 15 November 1960) was an Australian politician who represented the South Australian House of Assembly seat of Albert from 1921 to 1959. He represented three different parties: the Country Party (1921-1928), the Liberal Federation (1928-1932) and the merged Liberal and Country League (1932-1959).

In 1956 he was appointed a Knight Commander of the Order of the British Empire (KBE).

References

 

1888 births
1960 deaths
Members of the South Australian House of Assembly
Liberal and Country League politicians
20th-century Australian politicians
Australian Knights Commander of the Order of the British Empire
Australian politicians awarded knighthoods